The ten-dollar note was first produced in 1868 by The Hongkong and Shanghai Banking Corporation with the formal adoption of a currency system just for Hong Kong. There had been a variety of the green coloured ten-dollar notes issued by several banks concurrently. These were all phased out with the introduction of the ten dollar coin in 1994. 

Due to the high demand for the banknote, it was reissued under a new colour and design in 2002 by the Hong Kong Government. It was the first that the Government had issued any banknotes after the denomination of one-cent note in 1995 and the ten-dollar note remains the only circulating denomination that is issued by the Government rather than by authorised note-issuing banks. 

The reissued notes are primarily purple in colour. The ten-dollar notes states "Legal Tender in Hong Kong" whereas all other notes on Hong Kong, issued by banks, states "Promises to pay the bearer on demand at its Office here ... By order of the Board of Directors".

External links
Information for Hong Kong's ten dollar note (paper version)
Information on Hong Kong's ten dollar note (polymer version)

References

Ma Tak Wo 2004, Illustrated Catalogue of Hong Kong Currency, Ma Tak Wo Numismatic Co., LTD Kowloon Hong Kong.  

Banknotes of Hong Kong
Ten-base-unit banknotes